Small Town News: KPVM Pahrump is an American documentary miniseries. It follows news station KPVM-LD in Pahrump, Nevada, as they take on the challenge of expanding into the Las Vegas market. It consists of 6 episodes and premiered on August 2, 2021, on HBO.

Plot
Vern Van Winkle, the owner of KPVM-LD in Pahrump, Nevada, takes on the challenge of expanding into the Las Vegas market for more exposure.

Episodes

Production
Fenton Bailey and Randy Barbato came across KPVM-LD while working on their documentary Heidi Fleiss: The Would-Be Madam of Crystal, the two decided to then pitch a television series about the station, however, they could not get a network interested in a pilot. Bailey and Barbato also found Public-access television to be a ground for new talent and ideas.

The series picked up traction at the end of 2017, with principal photography commencing in January 2020. The series doesn't have a credited director due to the fact not everyone was on set or involved with the edit, with editing taking longer than filming.

In June 2021, it was announced HBO would produce and distribute the series, with Fenton Bailey and Randy Barbato serving as executive producers under their World of Wonder banner.

Reception
On Rotten Tomatoes, the series holds an approval rating of 71% based on 7 critic reviews, with an average rating of 9.00/10.

References

External links
 
 

2020s American documentary television series
2021 American television series debuts
Television shows set in Nevada
English-language television shows
HBO documentary films
HBO original programming
Television series by Home Box Office
Television series by World of Wonder (company)